What's New is an album of traditional pop standards released by American singer/songwriter/producer Linda Ronstadt in 1983. It represents the first in a trilogy of 1980s albums Ronstadt recorded with bandleader/arranger Nelson Riddle. John Kosh designed the album covers for all three albums.

Production
The album was a major change in direction because Ronstadt was then considered the leading female vocalist in rock. Both her record company and manager, Peter Asher, were very reluctant to produce this album with Ronstadt, but eventually her determination won them over and the albums exposed a whole new generation to the sounds of the pre-swing and swing eras. The one-time popular music sung by Frank Sinatra, Ella Fitzgerald, Tony Bennett, Rosemary Clooney, Peggy Lee, and their contemporaries was relegated in the 1960s and 1970s to Las Vegas club acts and elevator music. Ronstadt later remarked that she did her part in rescuing these songs which she called "little jewels of artistic expression" from "spending the rest of their lives riding up and down on the elevators." The album's second single, "I've Got a Crush on You" had already been part of Ronstadt's repertoire for several years, as she'd performed it during a 1980 appearance on The Muppet Show.

Reception

What's New was released in September 1983 and spent 81 weeks on the main Billboard album chart. Its release came as the radio programming format known as Adult Standards was taking off via programming concepts such as Music of Your Life, which specialized in returning pre-rock popular music and the songs of the Great American Songbook to the American airwaves. The album held the number 3 position for five consecutive weeks while Michael Jackson's Thriller and Lionel Richie's Can't Slow Down locked in the number 1 and number 2 album positions.  The album also reached number 2 on the jazz albums chart. It was RIAA certified Triple Platinum for sales of over 3 million copies in the United States alone.  Global sales surpassed five million. The album also earned Ronstadt another Grammy Award nomination for Best Pop Vocal Performance, Female alongside Donna Summer, Bonnie Tyler, Irene Cara and Sheena Easton, all of whom performed live on the 1984 Grammy telecast. Two singles, the title song and "I've Got a Crush on You," became hits on Adult Contemporary radio stations, with the title song also reaching the Top 50 on the Billboard Hot 100.

All tracks also included in the compilation "'Round Midnight", released on Asylum Records in 1986.

Stephen Holden of The New York Times noted the significance of the album to popular culture when he wrote that What's New "isn't the first album by a rock singer to pay tribute to the golden age of pop, but is ... the best and most serious attempt to rehabilitate an idea of pop that Beatlemania and the mass marketing of rock LPs for teen-agers undid in the mid-60s. In the decade prior to Beatlemania, most of the great band singers and crooners of the 40s and 50s codified a half-century of American pop standards on dozens of albums, many of them now long out-of-print."

Track listing

Personnel 
 Linda Ronstadt – vocals
 Don Grolnick – grand piano
 Tommy Tedesco – guitar (1-4, 6, 8, 9)
 Dennis Budimir – guitar (5, 7)
 Ray Brown – bass (1-4, 6, 8, 9)
 Jim Hughart – bass (5, 7)
 John Guerin – drums
 Plas Johnson – tenor sax solo (4)
 Bob Cooper – tenor sax solo (6, 7)
 Chauncey Welsch – trombone solo (8)
 Tony Terran – trumpet solo (2)
 Nelson Riddle – arrangements and conductor
 Leonard Atkins – concertmaster
 Nathan Ross – concertmaster

Production 
 Peter Asher – producer
 George Massenburg – engineer, mixing
 Barbara Rooney – recording assistant, mix assistant 
 Robert Spano – recording assistant, mix assistant 
 Doug Sax – mastering at The Mastering Lab (Hollywood, California).
 Gloria Boyce – album coordinator 
 John Kosh – art direction, design 
 Ron Larson – art direction, design
 Brian Aris – photography 
 Genny Schorr – wardrobe stylist

Charts

Certifications

References 

1983 albums
Linda Ronstadt albums
Albums arranged by Nelson Riddle
Albums produced by Peter Asher
Covers albums
Elektra Records albums
Asylum Records albums
Traditional pop albums